= Samsung SGH R220 =

Early Mobile Phone by Samsung

Samsung SGH R220 was one of the earliest phones made by Samsung Group. The phone was officially announced by the South Korean giant in January 2001. The dual-band GSM [900/1800] 2G network-equipped phone had single SIM functionality and it came with a WAP 1.1 inbuilt web browser. The phone came in three colors – Dark Gray, Green and Navy Blue.

The SGH R220 featured a monochrome graphics display with resolution of 128 X 64, blue back-lighting and dynamic font sizes. In addition to downloadable monophonic ringtones, it had a built-in ringtone composer. The phone did not come with internal memory but it had ability to keep the records of 10 dialed, missed and received calls, and was able to save up to 100 contacts.

The phone came with three games – Casino, Hexa and Mole. Its inbuilt applications included an organizer. It was backed by a Li-ion battery which was able to deliver 150 hours of standby and 5 hours of talk-time. The phone measured 110 X 46 X 23.5mm in dimensions and weighed 99 grams.
